Table tennis at the 2014 Asian Games was held in Suwon, South Korea from September 27–October 4, 2014. Two team events and five individual events were held at Suwon Gymnasium after the preliminary round of women's handball finished on September 25.

Singles, Doubles, and Team events were held at Suwon Gymnasium. China dominated the competition winning six of seven gold medals.

Schedule

Medalists

Medal table

Participating nations
A total of 169 athletes from 25 nations competed in table tennis at the 2014 Asian Games:

References

External links
incheon2014ag.org

 
2014
2014 Asian Games events
Asian Games
2014 Asian Games